Antonio "Nino" Castellini (14 April 1951 – 26 August 1976) was an Italian boxer who won a bronze medal at the 1971 Mediterranean Games in the light-middleweight category. Next year he competed at the Munich Olympics, but was eliminated in the first round by the eventual silver medalist Wiesław Rudkowski. After the Olympics he turned professional, and won a national super welterweight title in 1974–1976. He died in a motorcycle incident, aged 25.

References

1951 births
1976 deaths
Italian male boxers
Boxers at the 1972 Summer Olympics
Olympic boxers of Italy

Mediterranean Games bronze medalists for Italy
Competitors at the 1971 Mediterranean Games
Mediterranean Games medalists in boxing
Light-middleweight boxers
20th-century Italian people